The Four Seasons Hotel in Prague is a part of the Four Seasons chain of hotels and resorts. It is located near Charles Bridge with a view of Prague Castle. The hotel opened on 9 February 2001. New modern Italian restaurant  was opened in March 2012.

It is a 161-room hotel, including 20 suites.  According to a 2013 Fodors review, the hotel is keeping up to competition in the five-star hotel category by investing in renovations. The hotel was described as "the best hotel in Prague" by The Independent on Sunday in 2004.

The hotel is sited on three historic buildings, one from each of the Neo-Renaissance, neoclassical and Baroque periods.

References

External links

 

2001 establishments in the Czech Republic
Four Seasons hotels and resorts
Hotels established in 2001
Hotel buildings completed in 2001
Hotels in Prague
21st-century architecture in the Czech Republic